Sandra McCoy is an American former actress and dancer. McCoy is primarily known for being featured in the music video of NSYNC's 2001 single, "Pop" and as Vanessa in Porky's Pimpin' Pee Wee.

Early life and education
McCoy was born and raised in San Jose, California in a Filipino/Irish family. Her mother was a high school Physical Education teacher, tennis coach, and aerobics instructor. Her father was the director of database management at the County Sheriff's Department and a private pilot. Her parents, Madeline and Gary McCoy and her brother Scott McCoy died in late 1993 in an airplane crash in the Fresno area when their plane exploded midair. Sandra did not go on the trip as she had a swimming competition. Instead, her brother took a friend, Mark Guitterez (both students of Quimby Oak Jr. High School at the time of death), whom also perished in the crash.

McCoy has trained in dance and gymnastics since she was eight years old and was on the cheerleading squad and soccer and diving teams at Independence High School.

Career
McCoy moved to Los Angeles, where she still resides today, to pursue a career in show business after attaining a Bachelor's Degree in Psychology from Santa Clara University. Though her first attempt at Hollywood success, a four-girl pop group, fell through, McCoy has continued to enjoy several other successes in the film industry as both an actress and dancer. Her first real break into the business was booking the lead role in 'N Sync's "Pop" music video. In addition, she was a cheerleader for the Los Angeles Lakers in the season of 2002–2003 and made her calendar debut in Music Video Beauties of 2004.

McCoy made many appearances in small roles on several noted television shows before landing her first lead role. She is best known for her starring role as Mercedes in 2005's Cry Wolf, where she met her long-term boyfriend Jared Padalecki; however, the two ended their relationship in 2008.

In early March 2007, McCoy auditioned for the reality television series Pussycat Dolls Present: The Search for the Next Doll to become the seventh Pussycat Doll, but did not make it into the house. McCoy also guest-starred in the Supernatural episode "Bedtime Stories".

Filmography

Film

Television

Music videos

References

External links

21st-century American actresses
National Basketball Association cheerleaders
American cheerleaders
American female dancers
American dancers
American film actresses
American television actresses
American actresses of Filipino descent
American people of Irish descent
Living people
Actresses from San Jose, California
Santa Clara University alumni
Year of birth missing (living people)